Archibald Todd (11 April 1899 – 9 March 1981) was an Australian politician.

He was born in Carlton and attended local state schools before becoming a wood machinist. He was closely involved with the Timber Workers' Union, serving as state president and federal vice-president. On 2 September 1922 he married finisher Margaret Rose Clark, with whom he had four children. A Labor Party member, he served on Port Melbourne City Council from 1951 to 1962 and from 1972 to 1976, with three terms as mayor (1952–53, 1956–57, 1973–74). In 1955 he was elected to the Victorian Legislative Assembly for Port Melbourne. With his seat's abolition in 1958, he transferred to the Victorian Legislative Council, winning a seat in Melbourne West Province. He served until his retirement in 1970, during which time he was a party whip. Todd died at Elsternwick in 1981.

References

1899 births
1981 deaths
Australian Labor Party members of the Parliament of Victoria
Members of the Victorian Legislative Assembly
Members of the Victorian Legislative Council
20th-century Australian politicians